A static synchronous compensator (STATCOM), originally known as a static synchronous condenser (STATCON), is a regulating device shunt-connected to alternating current electricity transmission network. It is based on a power electronics voltage-source converter and can act as either a source or sink of reactive AC power to an electricity network.  If connected to a source of power it can also provide active AC power.  It is a member of the FACTS family of devices, that became possible in 1990s due to availability of powerful gate turn-off thyristors (GTO). STATCOM is inherently modular and electable. 

These compensators can also be used to reduce voltage fluctuations.

History and uses
A prototype 1 MVAr STATCON was described in a report by Empire State Electric Energy Research Corporation in 1987. The first production 100 MVAr STATCON made by Westinghouse Electric was installed at the Tennessee Valley Authority Sullivan substation in 1995 and was quickly retired due to obsolescence of its components.

Usually a STATCOM is installed to support electricity networks that have a poor power factor and often poor voltage regulation. There are however, other uses, the most common use is for voltage stability.

Construction and operation

A STATCOM is a voltage source converter (VSC)-based device, with the voltage source behind a reactor (STATCOM is connected to the utility grid via a transformer). The voltage source is created from a DC capacitor and therefore a STATCOM has very little active power capability. However, its active power capability can be increased if a suitable energy storage device is connected across the DC capacitor.
The reactive power at the terminals of the STATCOM depends on the amplitude of the voltage source. For example, if the terminal voltage of the VSC is higher than the AC voltage at the point of connection, the STATCOM generates reactive current (appears as a capacitor); conversely, when the amplitude of the voltage source is lower than the AC voltage, it absorbs reactive power (appears as an inductor).

A voltage droop of 1-10% (usually 3%) is built into STATCOMs.

STATCOM vs. SVC 
A static VAR compensator (SVC) can also be used to maintain the voltage stability. STATCOM is costlier than an SVC (in part due to higher cost of the GTO thyristors) and exhibit higher losses, but has few technical advantages. As a result, the two technologies coexist.

The response time of a STATCOM is shorter than that of a SVC, mainly due to the fast switching times provided by the IGBTs of the voltage source converter (thyristors cannot be switched off in a controlled fashion). As a result, the reaction time of a STATCOM is one to two cycles vs. two to three cycles for an SVC.  

The STATCOM also provides better reactive power support at low AC voltages than an SVC, since the reactive power from a STATCOM decreases linearly with the AC voltage (the current can be maintained at the rated value even down to low AC voltage), as opposed to power being a function of a square of voltage for SVC. The SVC is not used in a severe undervoltage conditions (less than 0.6 pu), since leaving the capacitors on can worsen the transient overvoltage once the fault is cleared, while STATCOM can operate until 0.2-0.3 pu (this limit is due to possible loss of synchronicity and cooling).

The footprint of a STATCOM is smaller, as it does not need external inductors and large capacitors used by an SVC.

See also
 Static synchronous series compensator (SSSC), a similar device connected in series
 Unified power flow controller, a combination of SSSC and STATCOM
 Synchronous condenser

References

Sources

External links
Conceptual survey of Generators and Power Electronics for Wind Turbines

Electric power systems components
Energy conversion
Electric power